= Jitadih =

Coordinates: 25°09′N 87°07′E

Jitadih is a village in panchayat- Murhan-Jamin, block- Goradih, district- Bhagalpur, state- Bihar.
